Here is a list of currently existing astronomical optical interferometers (i.e. operating from visible to mid-infrared wavelengths), and some parameters describing their performance.

Current performance of ground-based interferometers 

Columns 2-5 determine the range of targets that can be observed and the range of science which can be done. Higher limiting magnitude means that the array can observe fainter sources. The limiting magnitude is determined by the atmospheric seeing, the diameters of the telescopes and the light lost in the system. A larger range of baselines means that a wider variety of science can be done and on a wider range of sources.

Columns 6-10 indicate the approximate quality and total amount of science data the array is expected to obtain. This is per year, to account for the average number of cloud-free nights on which each array is operated.

New interferometers and improvements to existing interferometers

See also
 Lists of telescopes
 Photometric system has a key for waveband letters.

References

Further reading

Lists of telescopes
 
I